= Douaya clashes =

- Part of Mali war
Date	1 October 2013
Location	Douaya, Mali
Result	French victory

Belligerents
France	AQIM

Commanders and leaders
(France) Col. Gilles Jaron	?

Strength
(France) 1 Helicopter	+10 fighters 1 Pickup truck

Casualties and losses
None	All fighters are killed.

The Douaya clashes took place on October 1 during the Mali War, just three days after the Timbuktu attack where 2 civilians were killed.

== Clashes ==
On October 1, 2013, a confrontation took place between the French forces and Islamist fighters. On that day, the French were informed that jihadists had arrived at the Douaya market, approximately 120 kilometers north of Timbuktu, using several pick-up trucks. A helicopter was dispatched to the scene, but the jihadists fled upon seeing it. However, one of the vehicles was located later in the day. The helicopter fired warning shots, but the militants disembarked from the pick-up and opened fire. Subsequently, about fifty soldiers from the French Special Forces engaged in the ground operation. The clash lasted for four hours. According to the French army's account, all ten individuals who had exited the pick-up were "neutralized".
